Rhinolophus ferrumequinum alphacoronavirus HuB-2013 is a species of coronavirus in the genus Alphacoronavirus.

References

Alphacoronaviruses